Grumesnil is a commune in the Seine-Maritime department in the Normandy region in northern France.

Geography
The commune borders the neighbouring département of Oise.

Population

Places of interest
The church of St. Pierre, dating from the thirteenth century.
An eleventh-century chapel.
The seventeenth-century chateau.

See also
Communes of the Seine-Maritime department

References

Communes of Seine-Maritime